Sleeping Dogs is an upcoming film starring Russell Crowe and Karen Gillan. It is based on the E.O. Chirovici novel The Book of Mirrors (2017) which has been adapted by Adam Cooper and Bill Collage and produced by Nickel City Pictures. The film marks Adam Cooper’s feature length directorial debut.

Synopsis
A former homicide detective Roy Freeman (Crowe) is being treated for Alzheimer’s Disease but is forced to re-open an old case involving the murder of a college professor (Csokas) when new light comes from a mysterious woman (Gillian).

Cast
 Karen Gillan
  Russell Crowe as Roy Freeman
 Marton Csokas
 Harry Greenwood
 Thomas M. Wright

Production
The project is an adaptation by Adam Cooper and Bill Collage of E.O. Chirovici’s critically acclaimed novel, The Book of Mirrors with Cooper also on-board as director. Mark Fasano of Nickel City Pictures is producer, alongside Cooper, Collage and Pouya Shabazian of New Leaf Literary. Matthew Goldberg, Cliff Roberts and Highland Film Group CEO Arianne Fraser are executive producers. In August 2022 Crowe was announced in the lead role.

In November 2022 it was announced that Highland Film Group had agreed distribution deals with Signature Entertainment in the UK and Rialto Distribution for Australia and New Zealand, amongst other deals.

Casting
In February 2023 Karen Gillan, Marton Csokas, Harry Greenwood and Thomas M Wright were added to the cast.

Filming
The film started principal photography in Victoria, Australia in February 2023, with Crowe making himself at home in Melbourne.

References

External links

Upcoming films
Films shot in Melbourne
Films set in Victoria (Australia)